State of Terror is a political-mystery novel written by former United States Secretary of State Hillary Rodham Clinton and Canadian mystery novelist Louise Penny. The book was released on October 12, 2021, and was jointly published by Simon & Schuster and St. Martin's Press.

Premise

Background
The book project was announced on February 23, 2021, with the two authors' usual publishers distributing the work on October 21, 2021. The book debuted at number 1 on the October 31 New York Times bestseller lists for combined print and e-book fiction as well as hardcover fiction. It also appeared on Publishers Weekly's October 25 bestseller lists for Top 100 Overall and Hardcover Frontlist Fiction.

References

External links 
 

2021 American novels
Books by Hillary Clinton
2021 Canadian novels
Novels by Louise Penny
Collaborative novels
2021 debut novels
Political thriller novels
Novels about terrorism
Books about diplomats
Simon & Schuster books
St. Martin's Press books